Surma (Nepali: सुर्मा ) is a Gaupalika(Nepali: गाउपालिका ; gaupalika) in Bajhang District in the Sudurpashchim Province of far-western Nepal. 
Surma has a population of 9022.The land area is 270.8 km2.

References

Rural municipalities of Nepal established in 2017
Rural municipalities in Bajhang District